Aji Kahriz (also Romanized as Ājī Kahrīz; also known as Hāji Kehīrīz and Ḩājjī Kahrīz) is a village in Qeshlaqat-e Afshar Rural District, Afshar District, Khodabandeh County, Zanjan Province, Iran. At the 2006 census, its population was 42, in 9 families.

References 

Populated places in Khodabandeh County